Lily Adams Beck, née Elizabeth Louisa Moresby (1862 in Queenstown, Cork, Ireland – 3 January 1931 in Kyoto, Japan) was a British writer of short-stories, novels, biographies and esoteric books, under the names of L. Adams Beck, E. Barrington and Louis Moresby, and sometimes other variations: Lily Adams Beck, Elizabeth Louisa Beck, Eliza Louisa Moresby Beck and Lily Moresby Adams

Biography 

Elizabeth Louisa "Lily" Moresby was born on 1862 in Queenstown, Cork, Ireland, UK, the second child of Irish Jane Willis (Scott) and English John Moresby, a Royal Navy Captain who explored the coast of New Guinea and was the first European to visit the site of Port Moresby, and granddaughter of Fairfax Moresby. She had an elder brother Walter Halliday (9 November 1861 – 24 April 1951), and four younger sisters Ethel Fortescue (1865 - ?), Georgina (23 July 1867 - ?), Hilda Fairfax (16 December 1868 – 16 August 1893) and Gladys Moresby (5 April 1870 - ?). While there is some degree of uncertainty about her birth and early life, some sources suggest that Moresby was born in Queenstown, Ireland (then part of the United Kingdom).

She married a Royal Navy commander Edward Western Hodgkinson and formed a family. Moresby lived and traveled widely in the East, in Egypt, India, China, Tibet, and Japan.

Her first husband died around 1910 and then, in 1912, she remarried to retired solicitor Ralph Coker Adams Beck. In 1919, the marriage moved to Victoria, British Columbia, Canada, where she settled eventually and joined to the Canadian Authors Association. She became the first prolific, female fantasy novelist in Canada.

She began her writing career for The Atlantic Monthly, Asia, and the Japanese Gassho, publishing short-stories. These were gathered into collections since 1922. She was 60 years old by the time she started to publishing her novels, which commonly had an oriental setting. Her stories collected in The Openers of the Gate (1930) feature an occult detective inspired by the "John Silence" stories of Algernon Blackwood. According to the historian Charles Lillard, she was also a distinguished writer of esoteric works such as The Splendor of Asia (1926) and The Story of Oriental Philosophy (1928). She has been noted as a major writer of Theosophy. She also published under the pseudonym E. Barrington novelized biographies of British historical figures. The 1929 film The Divine Lady was based on her 1924 novel about 
Emma, Lady Hamilton, which was published as E. Barrington. Glorious Apollo (1925), a fictionalized biography of Lord Byron also published as E. Barrington, was a bestseller during the 1920s. The Thunderer is a historical novel revolving around the relationship between Napoleon and Joséphine.

She continued to write and traveling until her death at 68, on 3 January 1931 in Kyoto, Japan.

Works

L. Adams Beck
 The Ninth Vibration And Other Stories, (1922)
Contens: The Ninth Vibration; The Interpreter: A Romance of the East; The Incomparable Lady; The Hatred of the Queen; Fire of Beauty; The Building of the Taj Mahal, How Great is the Glory of Kwannon!; The Round-Faced Beauty.
 The Key Of Dreams: A Romance of the Orient, (1922)
 The Perfume Of the Rainbow And Other Stories, (1923)
Contains: The Perfume of the Rainbow.; The Man and the Lesser Gods; Juana; The Courtesan of Vaisali; The Emperator and the Silk Goddess; The Loveliest Lady of China; The Ghost Plays of Japan; The Marvels of Xanadu; From the Ape to the Buddha; The Sorrow of the Queen; The Perfect One, The Way of Attainment; The Day Book of a Court Lady of Old Japan; The Courtesan Princess; The Happy Solitudes; The Desolate City.
 The Treasure Of Ho: A Romance Of Revelation, (1924)
 The Way of the Stars: A Romance of Reincarnation, (1925)
 Rubies: An Adventure in Burma, (1925)
 Dreams And Delights: Fantasy Stories, (1926)
 The Splendour of Asia: The Story and Teaching of the Buddha, (1926)  (also titled: The Life Of The Buddha)
 The House Of Fulfilment: The Spiritual Romance of a Soul in the Himalayas, (1927)
 The Story Of Oriental Philosophy, (1928)
 The Way Of Power: Studies In The Occult, (1928)   (also titled: Siddhis, Miracles, & Occult Power)
 The Garden Of Vision: A Story of Growth, (1929)
 The Openers Of The Gate And Other Stories of the Occult, (1930)
Contens: The Openers of the Gate; Lord Killary; How Felicity Came Home; Waste Manor; The Mystery of Iniquity; Many Waters Cannot Quench Love; The Horoscope; The Thug; Hell; The Man Who Saw.
 The Joyous Story Of Astrid, (1931)
 Dream Tea: Fantasy Stories, (1934)
 A Beginner's Book of Yoga: A Compilation From Her Writings, (1937) (edited by D. M. Bramble)

E. Barrington
 The Ladies: A Shining Constellation of Wit and Beauty, (1922)
Contents: The Diurnal of Mrs. Elizabeth Pepys; The Mystery of Stella; My Lady Mary; The Golden Vanity; The Walpole Beauty; A Bluestocking at Court; The Darcys of Rosing.
 The Chaste Diana: The Romance Of The First Polly Peachum, (1923)
 The Gallants: Following According to Their Wont the Ladies!, (1924)
Contens: The King and the Lady; Her Majesty's Godson; The Prince's Pawns; The Pious Coquette; The Two and Nelson; The King and the Lady; The Wooing of Sir Peter Teazle.
 The Divine Lady: A Romance of Nelson and Emma Hamilton, (1924)
 Glorious Apollo: A Novel of Lord Byron, (1925)
 The Exquisite Perdita: A Novel of Mary Darby Robinson, (1926)
 The Thunderer: A Romance of Napoleon and Josephine, (1927)
 The Empress of Hearts: A Romance of Marie Antoinette, (1928)
 The Laughing Queen: A Romance of Cleopatra, (1929)
 The Duel of the Queens: A Romance of Mary, Queen of Scotland, (1930)
 The Irish Beauties: A Romance of the Luck of the Gunnings, (1931)
 Anne Boleyn, (1932)
 The Great Romantic: Being an Interpretation Of Mr. Samuel Pepys and Elizabeth, His Wife, (1933)
 The Graces, (1934)
 The Wooing of the Queens: Philippa, Adelais, Matilda, Elizabeth, Isabella, and Anne of Cleves, (1934)
 The Crowned Lovers: The True Romance Of Charles the First and His Queen, (1935)

Louis Moresby
 The Glory of Egypt, (1926)
 Captain Java, (1928)
 
Source:

References

External links
 
 
 
 
 
 E. Barrington at LC Authorities, with 7 records, and at WorldCat
 Louis Moresby at LC Authorities, with 3 records, and at WorldCat

1862 births
1931 deaths
20th-century British novelists
20th-century British women writers
British emigrants to Canada
British Buddhists
British fantasy writers
British women novelists
Women science fiction and fantasy writers
British historical novelists
Writers of historical fiction set in the early modern period